Ivy and the Big Apples is the third studio album by Australian rock band Spiderbait. It became a double platinum-selling record that reached the top 10 of the albums chart in Australia and won the 1997 ARIA Award for Best Alternative Release. It features the single "Buy Me a Pony", which was voted in at number one on the Triple J Hottest 100, 1996. The third single "Calypso" peaked at number 13 on the Australian singles chart and was notably featured in the movie 10 Things I Hate About You, despite not being included on the soundtrack.

Track listing

Charts

Weekly charts

Year-end charts

Certifications

Release history

References 

1996 albums
ARIA Award-winning albums
Spiderbait albums